Nashville is the ninth album by Bill Frisell to be released on the Elektra Nonesuch label and his first to be recorded in Nashville, Tennessee. It was released in 1997 and features performances by Frisell, bassist Viktor Krauss, Jerry Douglas on dobro, Ron Block on banjo and Adam Steffey on mandolin, with guest appearances from Robin Holcomb on vocals and Pat Bergeson on harmonica.

Reception 
The Allmusic review by Jason Ankeny awarded the album 4½ stars, stating, "record is both genuine and alien – while played with real affection for the country form and without any avant posturing, its sound is original and distinct, a cinematic variation on C&W tenets".

Track listing 
All compositions by Bill Frisell except as indicated.
 "Gimme a Holler" – 5:02
 "Go Jake" – 4:27
 "One of These Days" (Young) – 4:51
 "Mr. Memory" – 3:59
 "Brother" – 6:03
 "Will Jesus Wash the Bloodstains from Your Hands" (Dickens) – 3:09
 "Keep Your Eyes Open" – 3:31
 "Pipe Down" – 6:50
 "Family" – 5:22
 "We're Not from Around Here" – 4:22
 "Dogwood Acres" – 5:28
 "Shucks" – 4:15
 "The End of the World" (Kent, Dee) – 3:32
 "Gone" – 2:00

Personnel 
 Bill Frisell – guitar
 Viktor Krauss – bass
 Jerry Douglas (1-6, 9-10 & 12) – dobro
 Ron Block (2, 6, 8, 11, 13 & 14) – banjo
 Adam Steffey (2, 3, 6–8, 11, 13 & 14) – mandolin
 Robin Holcomb (3, 6 & 13) – vocals
 Pat Bergeson (2 & 8) – harmonica

References 

1997 albums
Bill Frisell albums
Nonesuch Records albums